David Mullett (born 18 August 1958) is an Australian former cricketer. He played one first-class match for Tasmania in 1981/82.

See also
 List of Tasmanian representative cricketers

References

External links
 

1958 births
Living people
Australian cricketers
Tasmania cricketers
Cricketers from Tasmania